Chris Walley (born 1954 in Wales) is a geologist, author, and tertiary education lecturer.

Life and career 
Chris Walley was born in Wales in 1954; however, he grew up in northern England. He received a Bachelor of Science in geology from Sheffield University and a Phd from the University of Wales, Swansea. He taught at the American University of Beirut (AUB) in Lebanon from 1980 to 1984, where he met his wife and where his two sons John and Mark were born.

From 1984 to 1994 he was based in Swansea where he was a consultant for the oil industry. He did fieldwork in a number of African and Asian countries and wrote numerous synthesis volumes on the geology of different countries. In the late eighties, he began writing in his spare time. He had two novels, Heart of Stone and Rock of Refuge, published under the pseudonym of John Haworth.

In 1994, he was asked to return to Lebanon to rebuild the Department of Geology at AUB and lived there with his family until 1998. During that time he carried out both teaching and research duties was also involved in setting up a large environmental project in the Bekaa with A Rocha Lebanon.

In 1998, he returned to the United Kingdom and began to make a new career in writing and editing, in particular for the Christian market. He retained his geological interests, however, and led field trips for Wheaton College (Illinois).

In September 2004 he started teaching again, geology and geography, at Gorseinon College, now Gower College Swansea. He taught geology and environmental science there full-time while writing in his spare time.

In summer 2014 Chris took the opportunity to take early retirement from teaching in order to take up the voluntary position of Mediterranean Conservation Science Coordinator with www.arocha.org. To do this more effectively, he and his wife moved to the south of France, where they are based between the two A Rocha France centres of Courmettes (Alpes-Maritimes) and Tourades (near Arles). He has a particularly strong link with the Domaine des Courmettes.

Author
As John Haworth, he wrote two thrillers, which were published in the United States by Crossway; and have also been translated into Swedish and German: Heart of Stone and Rock of Refuge. These are now available under his own name as Kindle ebooks.

Under his own name, he wrote The Lamb Among the Stars series.  The first two volumes, The Shadow at Evening and The Power of the Night, were republished by Tyndale in October 2006 as one hardback volume: The Shadow and Night. The next in the series, The Dark Foundations, was published at the same time.  The last volume, The Infinite Day was first published by Tyndale in May 2008.

Chris has also co-authored a number of non-fiction books, particularly The Life: A Portrait of Jesus (Authentic, 2003), with J. John.

Bibliography

As John Haworth
Heart of Stone (1988)
Rock of Refuge (1989)

As Chris Walley
The Lamb Among the Stars series
The Shadow at Evening (2002)
The Power of the Night (2003)
Reprinted in combined volume as The Shadow and Night (2006) 
The Dark Foundations (2006)
The Infinite Day (2008)

Co-authored/edited
Ten: Living the Ten Commandments in the 21st Century (with J. John) (2000)
Calling Out (with J. John) (2000)
God’s Priorities: Living Life from the  Lord’s Prayer (with J. John) (2001)
Walking with God (2002)
Marriage Works (with J. John) (2002)
The Life: A Portrait of Jesus (2003)

References

External links 
 Author's website
 

British thriller writers
Welsh geologists
Welsh male novelists
Welsh fantasy writers
Welsh science fiction writers
Alumni of the University of Sheffield
Alumni of Swansea University
Academic staff of the American University of Beirut
Living people
1954 births